Zee Cine Award for Best Track of the Year is chosen from public-opinion poll, and the song is declared a winner at the actual ceremony. This category was first founded in 2004 and it is considered a prestigious award for a particular song of the film to win. In 2011, the category was renamed Zee Cine Award for Viewer's Choice Song of the Year.

Winners 
The chosen songs are listed below:-

See also 
 Bollywood
 Cinema of India

References

Zee Cine Awards